The Sadist (also known as Profile of Terror and Sweet Baby Charlie) is a 1963 American exploitation film written and directed by James Landis, and stars Arch Hall, Jr. The film was distributed by Fairway International Pictures of the United States and Prima Film of Canada.

Plot

Three high school teachers, Ed (Richard Alden), Doris (Helen Hovey), and Carl (Don Russell), are driving through California's Antelope Valley on their way to a Dodgers game in Los Angeles. The group’s Chevrolet Bel Air has some trouble and they are forced to pull off to a gas station/junkyard on the side of the road. After examining the vehicle Ed concludes that the fuel pump will need to be replaced. Doris and Carl search the junkyard looking for the owner, but they cannot find him.

In the residence Carl finds a warm meal with a table set for four, but oddly enough nobody is in the house. The three realize this is very peculiar and start to seriously worry about their situation. At this point Charlie Tibbs, (Arch Hall, Jr.) a rather large young man wielding a Colt .45, and his semi-mute teenage girlfriend Judy (Marilyn Manning) show up. Charlie and Judy have spent the past several days heading west from Arizona, leaving a trail of corpses behind them. Law enforcement is on the hunt for them, but Charlie has managed to stay a step ahead by changing vehicles frequently and then killing the people who offer their help.

Charlie demands that Ed finish repairing the car and informs him that he and Judy will be stealing the Bel Air and taking off when Ed is done. Charlie threatens that if the three don't cooperate "it'll be the end of them." During the next hour, Charlie and his girlfriend verbally and physically torment Ed, Doris, and Carl; Doris calls Charlie an inhuman monster, and he rips her dress and smacks her, then forces Carl to kneel in the sand and plead for his life until Charlie finishes a soda, after which he shoots Carl in the head.

Ed begins to try to work out how many shots Charlie has left in the gun, and asks Charlie a lot of questions about the people he's killed on the way to their current location. Charlie reveals he has two reloads left, and reloads the gun while taunting Ed gleefully. Doris hears the hum of a motor and thinks the police are coming, and Charlie becomes paranoid. He makes Ed hide in the trunk of a car while Judy holds Doris at knifepoint. Two police bikes pull in. After a tense few moments, Doris screams for help while Ed bangs on the lid of the trunk, but to no avail; Charlie has shot both cops dead.

Charlie continues to try and force Ed to fix the car; Ed formulates a plan to run Charlie over with the car. Charlie switches on the radio, and he and Judy begin to kiss as the music switches to updates from the baseball game the teachers were on their way to. Doris gets in the car to try to run it, but Ed's plan to run over Charlie backfires when Doris can't muster the courage to step on the gas pedal. Charlie continues to coerce Ed into fixing the car, then orders him to put gasoline in the carburetor. Ed sprays gasoline in Charlie's eyes, then flees, and Charlie's damaged vision causes him to shoot and kill Judy. After mourning Judy's death and screaming like an animal, he vows to murder Ed and Doris.

Doris and Ed are able to evade Charlie until Doris screams when she discovers two dead bodies of the junkyard owners next to her where she is hiding. As Charlie shoots at her while she flees, Ed approaches with a heavy tool to try to knock him out. They pursue each other until Charlie corners Ed and kills him with one of the cops' guns, as his own has run out of bullets. Charlie steals the car Ed had been working on and drives after Doris as she runs. However, the car stalls repeatedly in the sand, and the baseball game begins playing on the radio again as Charlie abandons the car and runs after Doris with a knife.

Doris spots a stone cottage in the distance and runs inside to hide. However, she soon sees Charlie approach, and runs out again. She ducks behind the walls of an unfinished house nearby, where she is discovered again by Charlie, but as she flees once more, Charlie falls into a pit of rattlesnakes, where he is killed. The film concludes with a traumatized Doris listening to the end of the baseball game before turning and wandering up the trail into the desert.

Cast
 Arch Hall, Jr. as Charles A. Tibbs
 Marilyn Manning as Judy Bradshaw
 Richard Alden as Ed Stiles
 Helen Hovey as Doris Page
 Don Russell as Carl Oliver
 Joe Jesgarz as Table Flipper (Risk board game scene)

Production
The film is loosely based on the killing spree of Charles Starkweather, upon which the later films Badlands (1973) and Natural Born Killers (1994) were also based. It was shot by famed cinematographer Vilmos Zsigmond over a period of 2 weeks for $33,000.  A member of the cast doubled as the film's production manager. It was Zsigmond's first full-length film as a director of photography, and he is credited as "William Zsigmond."

Alden recalled that in order to save money the ammunition used in the film was real.

Arch Hall, Jr. was nearly killed during the filming of final scene in the snake pit. The film used actual venomous snakes, which had for the filming their mouths temporarily sewn shut. However, the snake handler had left the snakes on the set overnight and was late for filming the next day, when the film crew had put the snakes in the pit and began filming. However, they had used a crate that had un-sewn snakes in it. Hall Jr. was pulled out of the pit just as the snakes were about to get angry.

Reception
Ryan Gilbey of The Guardian, writing about the 1973 film Badlands in 2008, said that "Terrence Malick began writing his screenplay Badlands, based on [Charles Starkweather and Caril Ann Fugate's] bloodthirsty road trip, in 1970, when he was 27. The story had already been loosely dramatised in the 1963 film The Sadist, though hardly anyone remembers that one now."

Legacy
The film is a favorite of director Joe Dante, who owns the 35mm print that has been the source for many of the DVD releases of this film.

DVD release 
In 2007, Apprehensive Films released The Sadist onto DVD.

References

External links
 
 
Joe Dante on The Sadist at Trailers from Hell
 

1963 films
1960s thriller films
American independent films
American thriller films
American black-and-white films
1960s exploitation films
Films set in California
Films shot in California
American serial killer films
1960s serial killer films
1963 independent films
Articles containing video clips
1960s English-language films
1960s American films